Eric Kvello (born February 12, 1977) is a retired American professional soccer player.

Kvello grew up in Houston, Texas, where he played for the Houston Texans Soccer Club.  In college, he played for Georgetown Hoyas in 1995, 1996, 1997 and 1998. In February 1999, the Hershey Wildcats selected Kvello in the second round of the USL A-League. The MetroStars also selected him in the third round of the 1999 MLS College Draft.  Kvello signed with the MetroStars where he played two games. He was released midway through the season.  He then joined the Hershey Wildcats for the remainder of the 1999 season and the first eleven games of the 2000 season. He then finished the season with the Connecticut Wolves.  In October 2000, Kvello signed with the Harrisburg Heat of the National Professional Soccer League.  In 2001, Kvello spent time with both the Wildcats and the Reading Rage.  In 2002, Kvello played for the Carolina Dynamo.  In September 2002, the Heat traded Kvello, Steve Klein and Bernie Lilavois to the Cleveland Force in a complicated three-team trade deal.  Kvello later played for the amateur FC Lokomotiv in the Houston Football Association Championship Division.

Statistics

References

External links 
 Profile on MetroFanatic
 

1977 births
Living people
American soccer players
Association football forwards
North Carolina Fusion U23 players
Cleveland Force (2002–2005 MISL) players
Connecticut Wolves players
Georgetown Hoyas men's soccer players
Georgetown University alumni
Harrisburg Heat players
Hershey Wildcats players
Major Indoor Soccer League (2001–2008) players
Major League Soccer players
New York Red Bulls players
National Professional Soccer League (1984–2001) players
Reading United A.C. players
Soccer players from Houston
A-League (1995–2004) players
USL Second Division players
New York Red Bulls draft picks